Eupithecia yangana is a moth in the family Geometridae. It is found in Ecuador and Peru.

The wingspan is about 24 mm. The forewings are pale grey, crossed by darker grey lines, forming blackish dashes on the veins. The hindwings are paler grey, without markings towards the costa.

References

Moths described in 1899
yangana
Moths of South America